Vacha is a town in the Wartburgkreis district, in Thuringia, Germany. It is situated on the river Werra, 15 km west of Bad Salzungen, and 23 km east of Bad Hersfeld.

History
Within the German Empire (1871–1918), Vacha was part of the Grand Duchy of Saxe-Weimar-Eisenach.

Sons and daughters of the city 

 Georg Witzel (1501–1573), theologian and opponent of Luther
 Johann Gottfried Seume, (1763–1810) a German author and a Shanghaiing victim while traveling through, forced to become a Hessian soldier.  The local high school is named for him.

References

Inner German border
Wartburgkreis
Grand Duchy of Saxe-Weimar-Eisenach